Biesiesvlei is a settlement in Ditsobotla Local Municipality in the North West province of South Africa.

The village was in the news in June 2014, when eleven infants died there from drinking contaminated water; one article describes it as a 'tiny hamlet'; causing a grassroots effect with street protests and lawsuits.

References

Populated places in the Ditsobotla Local Municipality